Sean Mannion (born 6 October 1956 in Rosmuc, Ireland) is a former boxer in the light middleweight division. During his career he was based in and boxed out of Massachusetts in the United States. His most notable bout was against Mike McCallum for the vacant WBA title, which he lost over a fifteen-round unanimous decision. In January 2014, Rocky Ros Muc: Seán Ó Mainnín, a biography about Mannion's life and career, written by Rónán Mac Con Iomaire, was released. The book is written in Irish but an English version was also released. A film adaptation was released in July 2017 under the same title, produced and directed by Michael Fanning. 
RTÉ Documentary on One made a programme about Sean's story - Never Knocked Down - produced by Robert Mulhern which won gold in the 2015 Celtic Media Awards.

Professional boxing record

|-
|align="center" colspan=8|42 Wins (14 knockouts, 28 decisions), 14 Losses (3 knockouts, 11 decisions), 1 Draw 
|-
| align="center" style="border-style: none none solid solid; background: #e3e3e3"|Result
| align="center" style="border-style: none none solid solid; background: #e3e3e3"|Record
| align="center" style="border-style: none none solid solid; background: #e3e3e3"|Opponent
| align="center" style="border-style: none none solid solid; background: #e3e3e3"|Type
| align="center" style="border-style: none none solid solid; background: #e3e3e3"|Round
| align="center" style="border-style: none none solid solid; background: #e3e3e3"|Date
| align="center" style="border-style: none none solid solid; background: #e3e3e3"|Location
| align="center" style="border-style: none none solid solid; background: #e3e3e3"|Notes
|-align=center
|Win
|
|align=left| Terrence Walker
|PTS
|10
|17/03/1993
|align=left| Chelsea, Massachusetts
|align=left|
|-
|Loss
|
|align=left| Fabian Garcia
|UD
|10
|26/02/1993
|align=left| Westin Hotel, Boston, Massachusetts
|align=left|
|-
|Win
|
|align=left| Miguel Rosa
|TKO
|6
|10/12/1992
|align=left| Teacher's Union Hall, Boston, Massachusetts
|align=left|
|-
|Win
|
|align=left| Mike O'Han
|UD
|8
|28/09/1992
|align=left| Vista International Hotel, Waltham, Massachusetts
|align=left|
|-
|Loss
|
|align=left| Dariusz Michalczewski
|TKO
|3
|21/02/1992
|align=left| Legien Center, Mitte, Berlin
|align=left|
|-
|Win
|
|align=left| Miguel Rosa
|UD
|8
|14/03/1991
|align=left| Teacher's Union Hall, Dorchester, Massachusetts
|align=left|
|-
|Loss
|
|align=left| Henry Maske
|PTS
|8
|16/11/1990
|align=left| Alsterdorfer Sporthalle, Wandsbek, Hamburg
|align=left|
|-
|Loss
|
|align=left| Nelson Alves
|UD
|10
|05/10/1990
|align=left| Philips Halle, Düsseldorf, North Rhine-Westphalia
|align=left|
|-
|Loss
|
|align=left| David Vedder
|UD
|10
|16/09/1989
|align=left| San Francisco Civic Auditorium, San Francisco, California
|align=left|
|-
|Loss
|
|align=left| Pierre-Frank Winterstein
|PTS
|8
|16/11/1987
|align=left| Cirque d'hiver, Paris
|align=left|
|-
|Loss
|
|align=left| Fred Hutchings
|PTS
|10
|07/02/1987
|align=left| Stockton, California
|align=left|
|-
|Win
|
|align=left| Doug Mallett
|PTS
|8
|20/12/1986
|align=left| The Strand, Boston, Massachusetts
|align=left|
|-
|Loss
|
|align=left| Errol Christie
|PTS
|10
|29/10/1986
|align=left| Alexandra Palace, Muswell Hill, London, England
|align=left|
|-
|Win
|
|align=left| Jose Quinones
|PTS
|10
|29/08/1986
|align=left| Lowell Memorial Auditorium, Lowell, Massachusetts
|align=left|
|-
|Win
|
|align=left| Fred Hutchings
|PTS
|10
|02/05/1986
|align=left| Stockton, California
|align=left|
|-
|Win
|
|align=left| Wesley Reid
|UD
|8
|15/03/1986
|align=left| Sahara, Dorchester, Massachusetts
|align=left|
|-
|Win
|
|align=left| Stacy McSwain
|UD
|10
|14/12/1985
|align=left| Miami Beach Convention Center, Miami Beach, Florida
|align=left|
|-
|Win
|
|align=left| Billy Robertson
|TD
|7
|26/09/1985
|align=left| Marriott Hotel, Irvine, California
|align=left|
|-
|Win
|
|align=left| Bert Lee
|UD
|10
|22/07/1985
|align=left| Marriott Hotel, Irvine, California
|align=left|
|-
|Win
|
|align=left| Ricky Burgess
|TKO
|1
|13/05/1985
|align=left| Spinoff Roller Disco, Boston, Massachusetts
|align=left|
|-
|Win
|
|align=left| Doug Kaluza
|TKO
|5
|16/03/1985
|align=left| Rensselaer Polytechnic Institute, Troy, New York
|align=left|
|-
|Loss
|
|align=left| Mike McCallum
|UD
|15
|19/10/1984
|align=left| Madison Square Garden, New York City
|align=left|
|-
|Win
|
|align=left| Roosevelt Green
|KO
|7
|17/02/1984
|align=left| Atlantic City, New Jersey
|align=left|
|-
|Win
|
|align=left| Danny "Thunderhand" Chapman
|PTS
|10
|11/08/1983
|align=left| Yarmouth, Massachusetts
|align=left|
|-
|Win
|
|align=left| In-Chul Baek
|PTS
|10
|19/05/1983
|align=left| Resorts Casino Hotel, Atlantic City, New Jersey
|align=left|
|-
|Win
|
|align=left| Dennis Horne
|UD
|10
|16/03/1983
|align=left| Atlantic City, New Jersey
|align=left|
|-
|Win
|
|align=left| Larry Byrd
|KO
|10
|27/02/1983
|align=left| Resorts Casino Hotel, Atlantic City, New Jersey
|align=left|
|-
|Win
|
|align=left| Bill "Fireball" Bradley
|PTS
|10
|09/12/1982
|align=left| Atlantic City, New Jersey
|align=left|
|-
|Win
|
|align=left| Rocky Fratto
|UD
|10
|07/10/1982
|align=left| The Sands, Atlantic City, New Jersey
|align=left|
|-
|Loss
|
|align=left| Steve Michalerya
|PTS
|10
|15/09/1982
|align=left| Catholic Youth Center, Scranton, Pennsylvania
|align=left|
|-
|Win
|
|align=left| Hector Figueroa
|PTS
|10
|20/08/1982
|align=left| Plymouth Memorial Hall, Plymouth, Massachusetts
|align=left|
|-
|Win
|
|align=left| Ricardo Raul Camoranesi
|KO
|7
|23/07/1982
|align=left| Cape Cod Coliseum, South Yarmouth, Massachusetts
|align=left|
|-
|Loss
|
|align=left| Gary Guiden
|TKO
|4
|04/05/1982
|align=left| Caesars Palace, Las Vegas, Nevada
|align=left|
|-
|Win
|
|align=left| Nino Gonzalez
|PTS
|10
|21/01/1982
|align=left| Ice World, Totowa, New Jersey
|align=left|
|-
|Win
|
|align=left| Tony "Akbar Muhammad" Taylor
|PTS
|8
|25/11/1981
|align=left| Freeport Hall, Dorchester, Massachusetts
|align=left|
|-
|Draw
|
|align=left| Hector Figueroa
|PTS
|10
|15/10/1981
|align=left| Springfield Civic Center, Springfield, Massachusetts
|align=left|
|-
|Win
|
|align=left| Robert Sawyer
|SD
|8
|07/05/1981
|align=left| Playboy Hotel and Casino, Atlantic City, New Jersey
|align=left|
|-
|Win
|
|align=left| Sterling Quick
|UD
|8
|24/04/1981
|align=left| Lowe's Theatre, Worcester, Massachusetts
|align=left|
|-
|Win
|
|align=left| Ralph Doucette
|KO
|3
|10/01/1981
|align=left| Stanislaus Hall, Nashua, New Hampshire
|align=left|
|-
|Loss
|
|align=left| Tony Suero
|TKO
|8
|18/09/1980
|align=left| Ice World, Totowa, New Jersey
|align=left|
|-
|Win
|
|align=left| Steve Snow
|KO
|5
|21/08/1980
|align=left| Ice World, Totowa, New Jersey
|align=left|
|-
|Loss
|
|align=left| Ruby Ortiz
|PTS
|10
|18/04/1980
|align=left| Felt Forum, New York City
|align=left|
|-
|Win
|
|align=left| Lawrence Hafey
|SD
|10
|11/03/1980
|align=left| Halifax Metro Centre, Halifax, Nova Scotia
|align=left|
|-
|Win
|
|align=left| Patrick Maloney
|TKO
|7
|22/02/1980
|align=left| Bank Street Armory, Fall River, Massachusetts
|align=left|
|-
|Win
|
|align=left| Jimmy Corkum
|TKO
|6
|07/11/1979
|align=left| Boston, Massachusetts
|align=left|
|-
|Win
|
|align=left| Jaime Rodriguez
|PTS
|8
|19/05/1979
|align=left| Quincy, Massachusetts
|align=left|
|-
|Win
|
|align=left| Irving Booth
|KO
|2
|28/02/1979
|align=left| Belfast, Maine
|align=left|
|-
|Win
|
|align=left| Jaime Rodriguez
|PTS
|6
|24/02/1979
|align=left| Quincy, Massachusetts
|align=left|
|-
|Win
|
|align=left| Fernando "Frankie" Fernandez
|PTS
|6
|15/01/1979
|align=left| Freeport Hall, Dorchester, Massachusetts
|align=left|
|-
|Win
|
|align=left| Jesse Rogers
|KO
|6
|15/12/1978
|align=left| North Providence, Rhode Island
|align=left|
|-
|Loss
|
|align=left| Roger Leonard
|UD
|6
|09/12/1978
|align=left| Springfield Civic Center, Springfield, Massachusetts
|align=left|
|-
|Win
|
|align=left| Jose Ortiz
|PTS
|6
|11/11/1978
|align=left| Boston Garden, Boston, Massachusetts
|align=left|
|-
|Win
|
|align=left| Steve "Butterfly" Hughes
|PTS
|6
|03/11/1978
|align=left| Cumberland County Civic Center, Portland, Maine
|align=left|
|-
|Win
|
|align=left| Jose Ortiz
|KO
|5
|10/09/1978
|align=left| New Haven, Connecticut
|align=left|
|-
|Win
|
|align=left| Steve Coupe
|PTS
|6
|24/08/1978
|align=left| Boston Garden, Boston, Massachusetts
|align=left|
|-
|Win
|
|align=left|Tommy Pyke
|KO
|1
|10/07/1978
|align=left| Boston Garden, Boston, Massachusetts
|align=left|
|-
|Win
|
|align=left| Danny Perez
|PTS
|6
|28/06/1978
|align=left| Providence, Rhode Island
|align=left|
|}

References

External links
Stats on Boxrec.com

1956 births
20th-century Irish people
Living people
Middleweight boxers
Sportspeople from County Galway
Irish male boxers